The All People's Party may refer to:

All People's Party (Assam)
All People's Party (Bhutan)
All People's Party (Ghana)
All People's Party (Namibia)
All People's Party (Nigeria)
All People's Party (UK)